Gibbaria is a genus of plants in the sunflower family, endemic to South Africa. The only known species is Gibbaria scabra.

References

Calenduleae
Monotypic Asteraceae genera
Endemic flora of South Africa